Thiocyanic acid is a chemical compound with the formula HSCN and structure , which exists as a tautomer with isothiocyanic acid. The iso- form tends to dominate with the material being about 95% isothiocyanic acid in the vapor phase.

It is a moderately strong acid, with a pKa of 1.1 at 20 °C and extrapolated to zero ionic strength.

HSCN is predicted to have a triple bond between carbon and nitrogen.  It has been observed spectroscopically but has not been isolated as a pure substance.

The salts and esters of thiocyanic acid are known as thiocyanates.  The salts are composed of the thiocyanate ion (−SCN) and a suitable metal cation (e.g., potassium thiocyanate, KSCN).  The esters of thiocyanic acid have the general structure R–SCN.

Isothiocyanic acid, HNCS, is a Lewis acid whose free energy, enthalpy and entropy changes for its 1:1 association with a variety of Lewis bases in carbon tetrachloride solution at 25 °C have been reported.  HNCS acceptor properties are discussed in the ECW model.

References

Mineral acids
Thiocyanates